Rhacophorus translineatus is a species of frog in the family Rhacophoridae. It is found in eastern Tibet (China) and in Arunachal Pradesh, northeastern India.

Specimens have been found on banana leaves. Breeding takes place in lentic habitats such as lakes. Threats to this species are unknown.

References

translineatus
Frogs of China
Frogs of India
Fauna of Tibet
Amphibians described in 1977
Taxonomy articles created by Polbot